The 2009 Southwestern Athletic Conference men's basketball tournament took place from March 11–14, 2009 at Fair Park Arena in Birmingham, Alabama.

Format
The top eight eligible men's basketball teams in the Southwestern Athletic Conference received a berth in the conference tournament.  After the conference season, teams were seeded by conference record.

Bracket

References

2008–09 Southwestern Athletic Conference men's basketball season
SWAC men's basketball tournament